Darren Keefe (born Darren Keefe Reiher, 4 July 1975 ) is an American actor. He was born in Portadown, Northern Ireland.

Career
He moved to Los Angeles in 1998 from Ireland.
Reiher has appeared in television shows such as Lost, Private Practice, Rodney, and Summerland, as well as in the movies Soccer Dog: European Cup, My Big Fat Independent Movie, Hatchetman and Truth about Kerry. He had also written and produced his own series, Subs, which won a "Make Your Own Pilot" contest with the FX Network.

When not being an actor, he is also a carpenter, working on re-models of houses and designing his own wood work projects. In 2020, he is starring on the HGTV television show Extreme Makeover: Home Edition.

Filmography

References

Living people
1975 births
American male actors
British emigrants to the United States